is the major railway station in the city of Ōmura, Nagasaki Prefecture, Japan. It is operated by JR Kyushu and is on the Ōmura Line.

Lines
Besides the local services on the line, the Rapid Seaside Liner also stops at the station.

Station layout 
The station consists of two staggered side platforms serving two tracks. A siding branches off track 1. The station building is a timber building of traditional Japanese design which was built in 1918. It houses a waiting room, a kiosk, automatic ticket vending machines and a staffed ticket window. Access to the opposite side platform is by means of a footbridge.

Management of the station has been outsourced to the JR Kyushu Tetsudou Eigyou Co., a wholly owned subsidiary of JR Kyushu specialising in station services. It staffs the ticket window which is equipped with a Midori no Madoguchi facility.

The station building also houses the facilities of a community radio station "FM Omura 76.3".

Platforms

Adjacent stations

History
In the next phase of expansion, the track was extended south along the east coast of Ōmura Bay, with Ōmura opening as the new terminus on 20 January 1898. When the Kyushu Railway was nationalized on 1 July 1907, Japanese Government Railways (JGR) took over control of the station. On 12 October 1909, track from Tosu through Haiki and Ōmura to Nagasaki was designated the Nagasaki Main Line. On 1 December 1934, another route along the coast of the Ariake Sea designated as the Nagasaki Main Line. The track from Haiki through Ōmura to Isahaya became designated as the Ōmura Line. With the privatization of Japanese National Railways (JNR), the successor of JGR, on 1 April 1987, control of the station passed to JR Kyushu.

Passenger statistics
In fiscal 2016, the station was used by an average of 2,473 passengers daily (boarding passengers only), and it ranked 77th among the busiest stations of JR Kyushu.

Environs
Nagasaki Ken'ei Bus (Transportation Bureau of Nagasaki Prefecture) Ōmura bus terminal
Ōmura City Office
Nagasaki Airport - Change to a bus

See also
 List of railway stations in Japan

References

External links
Ōmura Station (JR Kyushu)

Railway stations in Nagasaki Prefecture
Railway stations in Japan opened in 1898
Ōmura Line